Demon Pond may refer to:

Film and stage
Demon Pond (play), a 1913 play by Kyōka Izumi
Demon Pond (1979 film), a 1979 film adaptation of the Izumi play directed by Masahiro Shinoda
Demon Pond (film), a 2005 film adaptation of Keishi Nagatsuka's revision of Izumi's play directed by Takashi Miike